Digital transformation is the adoption of digital technology by an organization to digitize non-digital products, services or operations. The goal for its implementation is to increase value through innovation, invention, customer experience or efficiency.

History 
Digitization is the process of converting analog information into digital form using an analog-to-digital converter, such as in an image scanner or for digital audio recordings. As usage of the internet has increased since the 1990s, the usage of digitization has also increased. Digital transformation, however, is broader than just the digitization of existing processes. Digital transformation entails considering how products, processes and organizations can be changed through the use of new, digital technologies. A 2019 review proposes a definition of digital transformation as "a process that aims to improve an entity by triggering significant changes to its properties through combinations of information, computing, communication, and connectivity technologies." Digital transformation can be seen as a socio-technical programme.

Adopting digital technology can bring benefits to a business, however, some company cultures can struggle with the changes required by digital transformation.

A 2015 report stated that maturing digital companies were using cloud hosting, social media, mobile devices and data analytics, while other companies were using individual technologies for specific problems. By 2017, one study found that less than 40% of industries had become digitized (although usage was high in the media, retail and technology industries).

As of 2020, 37% of European companies and 27% of American companies had not embraced digital technology. Over the period of 2017-2020, 70% of European municipalities have increased their spending on digital technologies.

In a 2021 survey, 55% of European companies stated the COVID-19 pandemic has increased the demand for digital technology, and 46% of companies reported that they have grown more digital. Half of these companies anticipate an increase in the usage of digital technologies in the future, with a greater proportion being companies that have previously used digital technology. A lack of digital infrastructure was viewed as a key barrier to investment by 16% of EU businesses, compared to 5% in the US. In a survey conducted in 2021, 89% of African banks polled claimed that the COVID-19 pandemic has hastened the digital transformation of their internal operations. Digital transformation gives enterprises new vitality. Now, economic consequences are a major concern for digital transformation.

In 2022, 53% of businesses in the EU reported taking action or making investments in becoming more digital. 71% of companies in the US reported using at least one advanced digital technology, similar to the average usage of 69% across EU organizations.

However, since there are no comprehensive data sets on the digital transformation at the macro level, the overall effect of digital transformation is still too early to comment.

See also 
 E-learning
 Electronic medical record
 Government Digital Service
 Online shopping
 Supply chain
 Real Estate

References

Business planning
Digital technology